The Merinolandschaf or Württemberger is a breed of domestic sheep derived from the Merino. It constitutes about 30% of the sheep population of Germany and is the most common commercial breed. It descends from the Merino sheep first brought to Saxony in 1765.

In 2018 a population of 15,378 was reported to DAD-IS.

References

Further reading  
 A. Fischer (2003). Deutsche Schafrassen (in German). Stuttgart: Ulmer. pp. 88–118.

Sheep breeds originating in Germany